Koszalin University of Technology (Politechnika Koszalińska) is a public technical university located in Koszalin and other cities, i.e. Chojnice.

The institution was established in 1968 as Higher School of Engineering. The university obtained its present name and status in 1996.

The university consists of the following faculties and institutes:

 Faculty of Civil and Environmental engineering
 Faculty of Economics and Management
 Faculty of Electronics and Computer Science
 Faculty of Mechanical Engineering
 Institute of Mechatronics, Nanotechnology and Vacuum Technique

The University is taking part in international exchange programmes, including Erasmus Programme.

References

External links 

 

Universities and colleges in Poland